Emsdettener Mühlenbach  is a river of North Rhine-Westphalia, Germany and is a tributary of River Ems in Emsdetten.  It has a length of 19.6 kilometers.

See also
List of rivers of North Rhine-Westphalia

References

Rivers of North Rhine-Westphalia
Rivers of Germany